Cameron Measurement Systems (formerly NuFlo Measurement Systems), is a division of Cameron, which designs, manufactures and distributes measurement, quality, and control instrumentation for the global oil & gas and process control industries.

History 
The division was first established in 2003 as NuFlo Measurement Systems, which was itself the result of merger of three measurement companies: Barton Instrument Systems, Halliburton Measurement Systems and PMC Global Industries.

Two strategic acquisitions made by the newly formed division included Caldon Inc. and Jiskoot Ltd. Caldon is a supplier of ultrasonic metering solutions and Jiskoot manufactures sampling and blending systems for oil and gas applications. These two business units are at the core of the division’s push to establish itself in fiscal and custody transfer applications such as LNG storage, ship loading & unloading and FPSOs.

Other acquisitions include PRIME Measurement Products, North Star Flow Products and the technologies of Polartek 2000 Ltd. and Sentech AS.

Cameron’s Measurement Systems division is in five key product and/or
capability sectors including DPU products, turbine meters and totalizers; and sampling
and blending. The division is also raising the bar for ultrasonic flow metering and
electronic flow measurement.

Measurement Systems division Brands 
 Barton
 NuFlo
 Clif Mock
 Caldon
 Jiskoot

Sub-Brands 
 True Cut
 Scanner
 MVX
 CoJetix

References 

Instrument-making corporations